The PAGE International Screenwriting Awards is an annual writing competition founded in 2003 with the stated mission to discover and promote up-and-coming screenwriters from around the world. The contest is judged by
Hollywood producers, development executives and representatives who are looking for new projects and new clients. In October of each year, they present 31 awards and a total of over $50,000 in cash and prizes to the scripts they deem most original, well written and viable. Entries are categorized by genre, with winners in each of the 10 sub-competitions vying for a Grand Prize.

After winning the PAGE Awards competition, many screenwriters have signed with agents and managers, obtained TV writing assignments, signed option agreements on their scripts and/or had their films produced, including Bill Dubuque, Steven Canals and Brooke Roberts.

Some of the PAGE winners who have gone on to build careers in the film and television industry: 

 Bill Dubuque: Ozark, The Accountant
 Steven Canals: Pose, Dead of Summer
 Brooke Roberts: The Flash, NCIS: New Orleans
 John Scott 3: Maggie, Parable X
 Jim Cliffe & Melodie Krieger: Donovan's Echo, The Haleo Protocol
 Marc Conklin: Memorial Day
 Laurie Weltz: About Scout, The Night Swimmer
 Janet Lin: Bones, The Night Shift
 Sang Kyu Kim: 24: Live Another Day, The Walking Dead
 VJ Boyd: Justified, The Player
 Davah Avena: Kevin (Probably) Saves the World, Grand Hotel
 Simeon Goulden: Spy, Secret Diary of a Call Girl

Grand Prize Winners
 2022: Thirstygirl by Alexandra Qin
 2021: iCon by A. J. Bermudez
 2020: Mother Wild by Claire Tailyour
 2019: Odyssey by Michael Kogge
 2018: Tundra Kill by Kevin Bachar
 2017: Jane by Kendell Courtney Klein
 2016: Changelings by Diane Hanks
 2015: Immaculate by Gareth Smith
 2014: Carnival by Matias Caruso
 2013: Leavenworth by Brooke Roberts
 2012: The Unraveling by Tobin Addington
 2011: Escape by Pat White
 2010: Supercat! by R. Scott Shields
 2009: Progeny by Mehul Desai
 2008: Honor Bound by Mike Amato
 2007: Solomon's Whale by John Arends
 2006: Warmonger, Inc. by Scott LaCagnin
 2005: X-Mas Files by Larry Postel
 2004: Monkey River by Laurie Weltz & Jay C. Key

In addition, Gold, Silver and Bronze Prizes are presented in the following genre categories:
 Action/Adventure
 Comedy
 Drama
 Family film
 Historical film
 Science fiction
 Thriller/Horror
 Short film
 TV Drama pilot
 TV Comedy pilot

References

External Links
 The official PAGE International Screenwriting Awards website

Awards established in 2003
Screenwriting awards